Paulo Shakarian is an associate professor at Arizona State University where he leads Lab V2 which is focused on neurosymbolic artificial intelligence.  His work on artificial intelligence and security has been featured in Forbes, the New Yorker, Slate, the Economist, Business Insider, TechCrunch, CNN and BBC.  He has authored numerous books on artificial intelligence and the intersection of AI and security.  He previously served as a military officer, had experience at DARPA, and co-founded a startup.

Career 
Shakarian was a major in the U.S Army serving from 2002 to 2014, undertaking two combat tours in Iraq and earning a Bronze Star and the Army Commendation Medal for valor. While in the army he was trained in Information assurance and completed a bachelor's degree in computer science at the U.S. Military Academy. In 2007 he served as a military fellow at Defense Advanced Research Projects Agency (DARPA). While in uniform, he went on to study a master's degree in computer science at the University of Maryland in 2009, and later a PhD in 2011 under the advisement of V.S. Subrahmanian.  His Ph.D. was focused on symbolic artificial intelligence, in particular logic programming, temporal logic, and abductive inference.

After obtaining a PhD he taught at the U.S Military Academy, West Point, as an assistant professor from 2011 to 2014, his final military assignment.. In 2014 he took a position as an assistant professor at Arizona State University. He earned his tenure at Arizona State and was promoted to Associate Professor in 2020.

Since 2011 Shakarian has authored six books on subjects relating to his academic career - many of them focused on the intersection between AI, security, and data mining.

In 2017, while maintaining his academic position he co-founded and led (as CEO) Cyber Reconnaissance, Inc., (CYR3CON), a business that specialized in combining artificial intelligence with information mined from malicious hacker communities to avoid cyber-attacks.  The company raised $8 million in venture capital and was acquired in 2022.

Notable works

Books 
 Introduction to Cyber-Warfare: A Multidisciplinary Approach.
 Diffusion in Social Networks (SpringerBriefs in Computer Science).
 Darkweb Cyber Threat Intelligence Mining.
 Artificial Intelligence Tools for Cyber Attribution (SpringerBriefs in Computer Science).
 Cyber Warfare: Building the Scientific Foundation (Advances in Information Security).
 Geospatial Abduction: Principles and Practice.

References

External links 
 Research Gate Profile
 Google Scholar Citations
 Computer Science Bibliography
 Academic Profile, Arizona State University
 CYR3CON website

American chief executives
Living people
Year of birth missing (living people)